English Without Tears is a 1944 British romantic comedy film directed by Harold French and starring Michael Wilding, Penelope Dudley-Ward and Lilli Palmer.  It was released in the U.S. under the title Her Man Gilbey, as a reference to the classic Screwball comedy, My Man Godfrey (1936).

The film depicts the romance between a young English aristocrat and her family's butler. During World War II, the butler becomes an officer of the Royal Army Service Corps and the girl joins the Auxiliary Territorial Service. Their change in status and her maturity affect their relationship. The world around them is also transformed.

Plot
In July 1939, the top-hatted deliveryman from a Fortune and Weedon carriage takes a basket of quail to the tradesman's entrance of Beauclerk House. An elaborate process brings the birds to the dinner plates of Lady Christabel Beauclerk (Margaret Rutherford) and her nephew, Sir Cosmo Brandon (Roland Culver). a British delegate to the League of Nations in Geneva. A fanatical bird expert, Lady Christobel identifies the ”quail” as a thrush and sends the “tortured friend” away in horror. She commands third-generation butler Tom Gilbey (Michael Wilding) to join them in Geneva, where she will propose sanctuaries for British birds. The xenophobic Gilbey almost quits, but his father and grandfather tell him it is his duty. Home from school, Lady Christobel's niece, Joan Heseltine (Penelope Dudley-Ward), talks about equality with the butler, on whom she has a longstanding crush.

In Geneva, the party meets Polish political cartoonist Felix Dembowski (Albert Lieven) and  French romantic novelist François de Freycinet (Claude Dauphin). The session and Norwegian interpreter Brigid Knudsen's (Lilli Palmer) translations provide a dose of dark humour.

Lady Christabel's outraged demands for sanctuaries and control of oil pollution are perceived as an attempt at British imperial expansion. One delegate engages Knudsen to find out more by vamping an oblivious Gilbey. A “romantic” row on the lake ends with Gilbey's appearance carrying a soaking Bridgid. The family speculates but ignores the issue. Joan springs to his defense—and tells them that she will love him forever.

2 October 1939. War has begun. Gilbey leaves to join the Territorial Army. Misled by Bonnie, Joan declares her love in a nearby tea shop. Citing her youth and class distinctions, he tells her it is hopeless. She refuses to give up. In May 1940, refugee Knudsen serendipitously encounters De Freycinet at the train station. Beauclerk House is The Sanctuary, housing European Allied officers. Gilbey, now a second lieutenant in the RASC, returns home to find Lady Christabel happily occupying his old room. He asks, hopefully after the rest of the family, and finds a mature, confident Joan teaching English to a large class of officers. At the tea shop, he explains how he has changed. He is now in love with her… Joan no longer loves him. He was “cold and inhuman and godlike”, and she knows hundreds of second lieutenants just like him.

Meanwhile, De Freycinet asks Brandon to get Knudsen a legitimate passport. Brandon assists, assuming, wrongly, that De Freycinet and Knudsen are lovers.  At The Sanctuary, Gilbey gets advice on seduction from several officers, but he makes an awkward mess of putting it to use. De Freycinet and Dembowski vie for Joan's affections by trying to be her top pupil, taking extra lessons from Knudsen. Lady Christobel approves of De Freycinet's suit.

De Freycinet asks Brandon for another endorsement so Knudsen can join the Free Norwegian Forces.  Brandon sends Gilbey to her apartment to confirm his belief that De Freycinet is her lover. Dembowski, De Freycinet and Joan arrive; the misunderstanding escalates; and Joan storms out. The three men plan to confront her, but cowardice prevails and at The Sanctuary's bar they drunkenly make up their differences and swear off women. Joan overhears and gives up on men. On 18 September 1940, she joins the Auxiliary Territorial Service. In December 1942 she is assigned to a notorious RASC major who ran through 6 typists in a month. It is Gilbey, now brusque, rude, demanding and intolerant, insisting that a staff member who has just given birth return to work. He tells an aide to get Joan a job she can do. In tears, she tells a sympathetic corporal that he is “wonderful”.

On his bicycle, a top-hatted Fortune and Weedon man delivers a basket of canned spam to Beauclerk House for the New Year's Eve United Nations Dance, where several of the film's couples come together. Tom and Joan “argue” about his being “out of reach.” He presses her against a pillar, and they kiss. Cut to the just-married couple running down the steps to the cheers of friends and family. Joan's new job: Gilbey's driver.  “I endeavor to give every satisfaction,” she declares, saluting him.

Cast
 Michael Wilding as Tom Gilbey
 Penelope Dudley-Ward as Joan Heseltine
 Lilli Palmer as Brigid Knudsen
 Claude Dauphin as François de Freycinet
 Albert Lieven as  Felix Dembowski
 Peggy Cummins as  Bobbie Heseltine
 Margaret Rutherford as  Lady Christabel Beauclerk
 Martin Miller as  Schmidt
 Roland Culver as Sir Cosmo Brandon
 Paul Demel as M. Saladoff
 Beryl Measor as Miss Faljambe
 Guy Middleton as Captain Standish
 Esma Cannon as Queenie
 Ivor Barnard as Mr. Quiel
 Paul Bonifas as Monsieur Rolland
 Richard Turner as  Delivery Man
 Judith Furse as Elise Batter-Jones
 André Randall as Dutch Officer
 Gerard Heinz as Polish Officer

Production
Harold French had directed the successful stage production of French without Tears starring Rex Harrison. He later called the film:
A bit of wickedness on Tolly de Grunwald’s part because it wasn’t good and made no real sense. Tolly, who was a lovely old villain, had found a backer and her persuaded Terry to lend his name to it. And of course Terry, who was then in the Air Force, needed the money. By the time we were shooting, I knew it wasn’t Terry’s dialogue. Penelope Dudley Ward was in it and she had a lovely comedy sense with a very light touch.

Critical reception
In contemporary reviews, The Glasgow Herald felt the film suffered in comparison to Rattigan and de Grunwald's previous success, French Without Tears, and regretted the absence of director Anthony Asquith's "light, witty touch”. Wilding, "(is) pleasant as the embodiment of the joke and Penelope Ward is charming as the trimmings to it. Roland Culver is beautifully suave in a small part, and Margaret Rutherford has a nice bit of philanthropic lunacy to do";  Across the pond, Variety wrote that despite "admirable direction and excellent photography, the story ambles along to no definite denouement. Therefore it's not a strong candidate for the American market. Smart dialog and witticisms galore are not sufficient to sustain so elemental a love story."

References

External links

Review of film at Variety

1944 films
1944 romantic comedy films
British black-and-white films
British romantic comedy films
1940s English-language films
Films directed by Harold French
Films produced by Anatole de Grunwald
Films with screenplays by Terence Rattigan
Films with screenplays by Anatole de Grunwald
Two Cities Films films
British World War II films
Films set in 1942
Films set in London
Films set in Geneva
Domestic workers in films
1940s British films